"The Party's Over" is a popular song composed by Jule Styne with lyrics by Betty Comden and Adolph Green. It was introduced in the 1956 musical comedy Bells Are Ringing by Judy Holliday. In the 1960 film version, Judy Holliday again performed the song.

According to the web-site SecondHandSongs, there have been almost 100 covers of The Party's Over. including versions by Nat King Cole, Smoking Popes, Bobby Darin and Doris Day.

Other notable versions
Lonnie Donegan reached the British charts in 1961, peaking at the No. 9 position during a 12-week stay.
Shirley Bassey recorded the song for her first Columbia album "The Fabulous Shirley Bassey" (1959). 
Gene Ammons recorded it for Prestige Records Late Hour Special (1961).  
Robie Lester released a version as a single on the Interlude label in 1966. 
Lesley Gore included a version of the song on her 1963 debut album, I'll Cry If I Want To. 
Leslie Odom Jr. ended his debut album Leslie Odom Jr. (album) (2016) with it. 
Seth MacFarlane included the song on his fifth album, Once in a While (2019). 
Bobby Darin included this song as the last track in his 8th studio album and debut album with Capital Records in 1962: Oh! Look At Me Now
The Gerry Mulligan Quartet included the song in their 1959 album "What Is There To Say?". Mulligan may have become familiar with it while he was living with Judy Holliday.

References

Songs about parties
1956 songs
Songs from musicals
Songs with music by Jule Styne
Songs with lyrics by Betty Comden
Songs with lyrics by Adolph Green
Shirley Bassey songs
Pop standards
Lesley Gore songs